Zalman Tech Co. (usually simplified as ZALMAN) is a South Korean company that develops and provides aftermarket desktop computer products with primary focus on cooling enhancement.

Zalman has done considerable product development since its founding in January 1999, and now holds several patents focusing on both cooling and fan noise-reduction. Personal computer systems can generate significant heat and noise, the management of which is important for those modifying or assembling computer systems. Zalman's product range includes specialized heat sink and fan solutions for CPUs, as well as quiet power supplies, computer water cooling systems, motherboard chipset coolers, graphics card heat sink and fan combos, laptop coolers, cases, and hard disk cases that lower temperature and reduce noise.

Zalman's primary competitors include Antec, Thermaltake, Spire, Cooler Master and Arctic.

Zalman has also developed a completely fanless case. It uses a fin based design to dissipate heat with heat generating components like the graphics card and motherboard transferring heat to the case body via a system of heat pipes and radiators.

Zalman introduced the CNPS9500AM2, a heatsink was meant specifically for socket AM2 compatibility on May 23, 2006. The company also broke into the headphone market with its 5.1 headphone system, ZM-RS6F/M.

Monitors
Zalman is a pioneer in stereoscopic (three-dimensional) LCD monitors, which utilize +45°/+45° polarized 3D glasses. These products allow the user to play games and other 3D media in full 3D stereoscopy (but with a 50% drop in vertical resolution per frame since only every second line is visible to each eye). Its 3D driver requires the native vertical resolution.

 M190 (4:3)
 M215W (full HD)
 M220W (pivot display)
 M240W (full HD)
 M320W-F (full HD)
Mxxx ≙ xxx÷10 inch
 SG100G (glasses)
 SG100C (clip)

Financial issues

On 30 October 2014, it was reported that Zalman had defaulted on a large loan amounting to over 3 billion won. Following this, the company applied for "initiation of corporate turnaround process". This means the company is attempting to return itself to solvency.

Gallery

See also
Antec
Arctic
Computer cooling
Cooler Master
FSP Group
Lian Li
PCCooler
Quiet PC
SilverStone Technology
Thermalright
Thermaltake
Vantec

References

External links

Zalman Korea
Zalman USA

South Korean companies established in 1999
Electronics companies of South Korea
Computer enclosure companies
Computer power supply unit manufacturers
Computer hardware cooling
South Korean brands